The Bed O' Roses Invitational Stakes is a Grade III American Thoroughbred horse race for fillies and Mares four-year-olds and older, over a distance of seven furlongs on the dirt track held annually in early June at Belmont Park in Elmont, New York.  The event currently carries a purse of $250,000.

History

The race was named for Alfred G. Vanderbilt II's Hall of Fame inductee, Bed O' Roses, the American Champion Two-Year-Old Filly in 1949 and the American Champion Older Female Horse of 1952.

This race was first run at Jamaica Race Course and continued there until 1959, after which it moved to Aqueduct Racetrack, where it was run until 2010.  It was run in two divisions in 1964 and 1979 and its distance for its first three years was a mile and a sixteenth and then again in 1977 and 1978.  It was contested at one mile from 1960 through 2005 with the exception of 1984 when it was set at a mile and seventy yards.

The event was changed from a Handicap to an Invitational Stake in 2017.

Records
Speed record:
 1:21.11 – Lewis Bay (2018) (at current distance of 7 furlongs)
 1:33.60 – Dixie Flag (1998) (at previous distance of 8 furlongs)

Most wins:
 2 – Straight Deal II (1967, 1968)
 2 – Lady D'Accord (1992, 1993)
 2 – Raging Fever (2002, 2003)
 2 – By the Moon (2016,2017)

Most wins by a jockey:
 3 – Robbie Davis (1984, 1987, 1994)

Most wins by a trainer:
 7 – H. Allen Jerkens (1964, 1973, 1988, 1994, 1995, 1998, 2004)

Most wins by an owner:
 3 – Hobeau Farm (1964, 1973, 1995)

Winners

Notes:

† Run in Divisions

References

External links
 The Bed O' Roses Handicap at Pedigree Query

Graded stakes races in the United States
Horse races in New York (state)
Sprint category horse races for fillies and mares
Recurring sporting events established in 1957
Aqueduct Racetrack
Belmont Park
Jamaica Race Course
1957 establishments in New York (state)
Grade 3 stakes races in the United States